Dashli Arqach (also Romanized as Dāshlī Arqāch and Dāshlī Ārqāch) is a village in Golidagh Rural District, Golidagh District, Maraveh Tappeh County, Golestan Province, Iran. At the 2006 census, its population was 248, in 43 families.

References 

Populated places in Maraveh Tappeh County